Daria Serhiivna Snihur (born 27 March 2002) is a Ukrainian tennis player. Snigur has a career-high WTA rankings of world No. 105 in singles, achieved on 14 November 2022. She has won six singles titles at tournaments of the ITF Women's Circuit.

Junior Career
In 2017, the champions of tennis tournaments in the junior group Daria Snihur and Maria Dolzhenko signed contracts with the International Tennis Academy (ITA), established with the support of people's deputy Ihor Kononenko, according to which the ITA should fund training and away tournaments for young tennis players to reach 18 age.

On the ITF Junior Circuit, Snihur has a career-high ranking of No. 2, achieved on 28 October 2019, after reaching the final of the ITF Junior Finals.

On 12 July 2019, Snihur became the second Ukrainian junior champion at Wimbledon after Kateryna Volodko. After reaching her first Grand Slam junior singles final, she defeated Alexa Noel, in straight sets.

Professional career

2022: Grand Slam debut & first top-10 win
She made her Grand Slam main-draw debut as a qualifier at the 2022 US Open. In the first round, she upset two-time Grand Slam champion and former world No. 1, Simona Halep. This was Snihur's first top-10 and career win at a major event. In the second round, Snihur made 48 unforced errors and lost to Rebecca Marino, in straight sets.

She reached finished the year ranked No. 106 on 7 November 2022 and reached a career-high ranking of No. 105 a week later.

Performance timelines
Only main-draw results in WTA Tour, Grand Slam tournaments, Fed Cup/Billie Jean King Cup and Olympic Games are included in win–loss records.

Singles 
Current after the 2023 Australian Open.

ITF finals

Singles: 9 (6 titles, 3 runner–ups)

Junior Grand Slam tournament finals

Singles: 1 (title)

Head-to-head records

Record against top 10 players
Snihur's record against players who have been ranked in the top 10 (active players are in boldface):

Top 10 wins

Record against No. 11–20 players
Snihur's record against players who have been ranked world No. 11–20.

  Yanina Wickmayer 2–0
  Peng Shuai 0–1

* statistics correct .

Notes

References

External links
 
 

2002 births
Living people
Ukrainian female tennis players
Sportspeople from Kyiv
Wimbledon junior champions
Grand Slam (tennis) champions in girls' singles
21st-century Ukrainian women